"Wizards of the Sonic" is a song by German DJ WestBam. It was released in June 1994 as the second single from the album, Bam Bam Bam.

Track listing
 "Wizards of the Sonic" - Part 1: (Original) - 7:19
 "Wizards of the Sonic" - Part 2: (Subliminal) - 7:02
 "Wizards of the Sonic" - Part 3: (Radional) - 3:05

Lista Remix 
 "Wizards of the Sonic" (Matt Darey Radio Edit)
 "Wizards of the Sonic" (Matt Darey Remix)
 "Wizards of the Sonic" (Dextrous Remix)
 "Wizards of the Sonic" (Original Red Jerry '95 Remix)
 "Wizards of the Sonic" (C. J. Bolland Remix)
 "Wizards of the Sonic" (Matt Darey Dub)

Chart performance

See also
 Sonic the Hedgehog 2

References

External links 
Discogs

1994 singles
1994 songs